Rutherford is a liquid-propellant rocket engine designed by aerospace company Rocket Lab and manufactured in Long Beach, California. The engine is used on the company's own rocket, Electron. It uses LOX (liquid oxygen) and RP-1 (refined kerosene) as its propellants and is the first flight-ready engine to use the electric-pump feed cycle. The rocket uses a similar engine arrangement to the Falcon 9; a two-stage rocket using a cluster of nine identical engines on the first stage, and one vacuum-optimized version with a longer nozzle on the second stage. This arrangement is also known as an octaweb.

First test-firing took place in 2013. The engine was qualified for flight in March 2016 and had its first flight on 25 May 2017. As of May 2022, the engine has powered 26 Electron flights in total, making the count of flown engines 260.

Description 
Rutherford is named after renowned New Zealand-born scientist Ernest Rutherford. It is a small liquid-propellant rocket engine designed to be simple and cheap to produce. It is used as both a first-stage and a second-stage engine, which simplifies logistics and improves economies of scale. To reduce its cost, it uses the electric-pump feed cycle, being the first flight-ready engine of such type. It is fabricated largely by 3D printing, using a method called electron-beam melting. Its combustion chamber, injectors, pumps, and main propellant valves are all 3D-printed.

As with all pump-fed engines, the Rutherford uses a rotodynamic pump to increase the pressure from the tanks to that needed by the combustion chamber. The use of a pump avoids the need for heavy tanks capable of holding high pressures and the high amounts of inert gas needed to keep the tanks pressurized during flight.

The pumps (one for the fuel and one for the oxidizer) in electric-pump feed engines are driven by an electric motor. The Rutherford engine uses dual brushless DC electric motors and a lithium polymer battery. It is claimed that this improves efficiency from the 50% of a typical gas-generator cycle to 95%. However, the battery pack increases the weight of the complete engine and presents an energy conversion issue.

Each engine has two small motors that generate  while spinning at 40 000 rpm.

The engine is regeneratively cooled, meaning that before injection some of the cold RP-1 is passed through cooling channels embedded in the combustion chamber and nozzle structure, transferring heat away from them, before finally being injected into the combustion chamber.

See also

Curie (rocket engine)
 TEPREL
Merlin (rocket engine family)

References

External links
 Rocket Lab Propulsion Section

Rutherford
Rocket engines using kerosene propellant
Rocket engines using the electric pump-fed cycle
Space programme of New Zealand
Space program of the United States